Rich, Young and Beautiful (German title:Dorine und der Zufall) is a 1928 Austrian silent film directed by Fritz Freisler and starring Fay Marbe, Ernő Verebes and Igo Sym. It was made by Austria's leading film studio Sascha-Film. In 1929 the film was released in Britain by Ideal Films.

The film's sets were designed by the art director Hans Ledersteger.

Cast
 Fay Marbe as Dorine, ein Mädchen aus dem Dollarlande 
 Ernő Verebes as Emanuel, ein Mathematiker 
 Igo Sym as Robert, ein junger Kaufmann  
 Hans Thimig as Paul  
 Richard Waldemar

References

Bibliography
 Bock, Hans-Michael & Bergfelder, Tim. The Concise CineGraph. Encyclopedia of German Cinema. Berghahn Books, 2009.

External links

1928 films
Films directed by Fritz Freisler
Austrian silent feature films
Austrian black-and-white films